Petrow (also Romanized as Peţrow, Patrow, Paţrū, Peţrāv, and Petroo) is a village in Safaiyeh Rural District, in the Central District of Zaveh County, Razavi Khorasan Province, Iran. At the 2006 census, its population was 1,470, in 342 families.

References 

Populated places in Zaveh County